Random 1 is a documentary-style reality television series that aired from November 2005 to January 2006 on the A&E cable network. In each episode, hosts John Chester and Andre Miller travel from town to town, in Miller's real-life, rickety pickup truck Jackie, searching for total strangers who are looking to have their lives changed. However, unlike other such "do-gooder" shows, Chester and Miller employ an all-shapes-and-sizes approach, with assignments ranging from a new cell phone to a week in rehab to a new prosthetic leg. The show ran for one season, and premiered to favorable reviews.

The crew abides by a set of rules:  the person being helped must be a stranger, the mission must be completed in one day, and no money may be spent (as Chester explains in Episode 4, "Out Of The Woods", this is because money distances a philanthropist from the person they are trying to help. All three of these rules were eventually broken in the course of the season, however). In order to free up John and Andre to get to know the subject of a given episode, they are aided by three producers in an internet-ready mobile RV.  Capella Fahoome, Jim Lefter, and Molly Schrek, once a subject has been decided on, go to their laptops and cell phones, searching for local businesses or individuals willing to help.  Typically, the "street team" and the "RV team" do not interact except over the phone, although this policy, too, has had its exceptions.

Although Random 1 is no longer on the air, the A&E network granted the team permission to present individual episodes as webcasts, which may be viewed on the show's website. DVD sets of the show have yet to be mass-produced, but individual episodes may be purchased directly from A&E.

As of May 24, 2007, there was no planned DVD release of the show itself, however, a feature film adaptation featuring Mark and Normand is touring the festival circuit, having premiered at South By Southwest.  It combines footage from episodes 4 and 10, along with behind-the-scenes footage of the show, and new footage of Mark and Normand's post-Random 1 experiences. It is entitled Lost In Woonsocket.

Cast
 John Chester (scout and co-founder)
 Andre Miller (scout and co-founder)
 Jim Lefter (producer)
 Capella Fahoome (producer)
 Molly Schrekengost (producer)
 Jackie (truck)

Season 1 (2005-06)

Episode 1 - Out on a Limb
In Baltimore, John and Andre meet Bruce, a homeless, one-legged former construction worker, who is struggling to keep his life together, begging for change while hobbling around on a very outdated prosthetic limb.  The crew attempts to find a prosthetic company willing to donate a $22,000 prosthetic leg.  The Bruce story is intertwined with the story of Kim, from Stamford, Connecticut, a young woman with a comfortable job who wants to do more with her life.  The crew searches for a non-profit agency interested in hiring Kim.

Episode 2 - Courage to Quit
Reportedly filmed on a "dress rehearsal" day at the very beginning of production, this episode concerns Cleveland and Gary, an asthmatic builder in need of a new cell phone, and a recovering heroin addict, respectively.  Inspired by John and Andre's life philosophy, Cleveland quits his job as the cameras roll, and shortly thereafter has an asthma attack on the side of the road.  In the meantime, and very much to John's chagrin, Andre has added heroin addict Gary to the mix, packing the four men into Jackie's cab like sardines.    As though all this were not enough, it turns out Cleveland and Gary have more in common than they would have guessed.

Episode 3 - The Stripper & the Maestro
In Baltimore, John and Andre meet Amber, a former stripper, and her rodentine boyfriend.  Amber wants to become a model, and the crew sets about finding a model agency that will meet with her, although her domineering boyfriend seems visibly opposed to the idea.  The episode is intertwined with the story of Jan, a Huntington, West Virginia native, who plays his mostly-broken keyboard on the street for money.  The crew sets about finding him a place that will repair his keyboard.  Though the keyboard was beyond repair,  the gentlemen who promised to repair it gave him a new keyboard instead.

(After the episode aired, viewers learned on the show's website that Jan's cantankerous, alcoholic roommate Mary sold the keyboard to pay for beer and toilet paper.  Viewers responded by making donations towards a new keyboard.)

Episode 4 - Out of the Woods
In Woonsocket, Rhode Island, John and Andre encounter Mark, a homeless alcoholic living in a tent in the woods.  Mark has attempted to go to detox in the past, but a $250 deductible is standing in the way.  As darkness falls, the crew is faced with the choice of breaking one of its cardinal rules, by spending its own money, a decision which splits the group in two, and causes the mild-mannered Molly to use an unexpected swear word.

Additionally, the crew meets Mark's tentmate Normand, who seems to be in even worse shape than Mark, and who at the time is completely inebriated.  John and Andre worry that Normand may seduce Mark back to the woods.  Both John and Andre are concerned about whether Mark will indeed go through with detox, although the ordinarily bubbly Andre is especially pessimistic.

Portions of this episode appear in Random 1'''s feature film Lost In Woonsocket, which has been shown at film festivals.

Episode 5 - Hope for the Holidays
While traveling through New Rochelle, New York, the team meets Stephen, an out-of-work chef, about to be evicted from his home.  He is especially concerned about how this will impact his daughter, Asia, who he dotes on.  The RV crew scrambles to line up interviews with restaurants in the area, although it begins to look as though he will have no choice but to leave his apartment.

The team revisited Stephen later that year, the results of which make up the last five minutes of the episode.

Episode 6 - Johnny Oxygen & the Butterfly
Easily the strangest episode of the season, John and Andre meet John, a conniving old man with breathing problems (who, despite this, continues to smoke constantly), who needs a stronger air conditioner.  Along the way, they meet Erin, who, like Amber, wants to be a model.  The RV team is flabbergasted at the difficulty of keeping New Yorkers on the phone long enough to make their pitch, and Erin appears as though she might flake out and not show up at all the next morning.  The episode is particularly noteworthy for its inclusion of eccentric modeling guru Candy Ford.

Episode 7 - Permission to Grow
This episode concerns Tom and Mary, a Baltimore couple struggling to open a bar, and Kevin, a young man from Providence, Rhode Island with a stuttering problem, who wants to go on his first date.  Kevin is ready to go, but his parents are not so excited.

Episode 8 - Taking the Weight Off
John and Andre meet Kim, a single mother in Louisville, Kentucky, who is struggling to make ends meet and needs to fix her dryer.  The episode is intertwined with the story of Mike, who is dangerously overweight and looking to get his life back on track.

Episode 9 - Tough Breaks
This episode involves Terrence, an Akron, Ohio native with a fantastic singing voice who was fleeced by a shady producer.  We also meet West Virginia native and spousal abuse survivor Robyn, who is looking to get a criminal law degree, but has so far not made it through the application process.  The team attempts to get them moving in the right direction.

Episode 10 - Beyond the Norm
While watching an episode of Dog The Bounty Hunter, a man named Timothy saw a commercial for Random 1, and recognized a man he had not talked to in thirteen years—Normand, from Episode 4, his estranged father.  He contacted the Random 1 team, and with his help they, along with a now-sober Mark, returned to Woonsocket, Rhode Island to search for Normand.

Portions of this episode appear in Random 1's feature film Lost In Woonsocket'', which has been being shown at film festivals.

Origins
The project began in 1996 when documentary filmmaker John Chester joined fitness trainer Andre Miller to seek out strangers for assistance; starting in 1999, the pair began documenting their experiences on film.

In 2001, three volunteer producers joined the project, initially working out of a basement office. In 2004, the group acquired a customized RV donated by the manufacturer for use as a mobile support center.

A&E began airing the group's efforts as a 10-episode series in November 2005.

References

External links
 
  at AEtv.com

A&E (TV network) original programming
Philanthropy
2000s American reality television series
2005 American television series debuts
2006 American television series endings
English-language television shows